Austria women's national goalball team is the women's national team of Austria.  Goalball is a team sport designed specifically for athletes with a vision impairment.  The team takes part in international competitions.

World Championships  

IBSA World Goalball Championships have been held every four years from 1978.  

The 1982 World Championships were held at Butler University in Indianapolis, Indiana.  The team was one of six teams participating, and they finished fifth overall.

See also 

 Disabled sports 
 Austria men's national goalball team 
 Austria at the Paralympics

References

National women's goalball teams
Austria at the Paralympics
Women's national sports teams of Austria
European national goalball teams